The Men's Combined in the 2020 FIS Alpine Skiing World Cup involved 3 events, all of which were completed before the season was halted due to the COVID-19 pandemic. A major change was made in the discipline this season due to the recent dominance of slalom specialists in the combined over speed racers (downhill/Super G). As was previously the case, the first run continued to be the speed discipline (with Super-G having the preference over downhill). The second run (the slalom) then started in reverse order of finish in the speed run, which allowed the slalom specialists (who tended to be significantly slower in the speed run) to tackle fresh snow as the first down the hill in the slalom run, while the speed specialists had to face the more challenging rutted snow at the end of the day, as the last skiers of the 30 who qualified for the second run.  Instead, the second run was changed to start in the same order as the finish of the speed run, so that the leader after the speed run became the first to race on the fresh slalom course.

In the 2020 season, two of the three combined races were run as a Super-G followed by a slalom (traditionally called an Alpine combined); only the race at Wengen featured a downhill followed by a slalom (traditionally known as a super-combined). Two of the three events (both of the Alpine combineds) were won by Alexis Pinturault of France, the only skier this season who ranked in the top ten in both Super-G and slalom, who thus won the season championship. At this time, combined races were not included in the season finals, which were scheduled in 2020 in Cortina d'Ampezzo, Italy (but were not held due to the pandemic).

Standings

DNS = Did Not Start
DNF1 = Did Not Finish run 1
DNF2 = Did Not Finish run 2

See also
 2020 Alpine Skiing World Cup – Men's summary rankings
 2020 Alpine Skiing World Cup – Men's Overall
 2020 Alpine Skiing World Cup – Men's Downhill
 2020 Alpine Skiing World Cup – Men's Super-G
 2020 Alpine Skiing World Cup – Men's Giant Slalom
 2020 Alpine Skiing World Cup – Men's Slalom
 2020 Alpine Skiing World Cup – Men's Parallel
 World Cup scoring system

References

External links
 Alpine Skiing at FIS website

Men's Combined
FIS Alpine Ski World Cup men's combined discipline titles